Kids in Love may refer to:

 Kids in Love (film), a 2016 British film
 Kids in Love (album), a 2017 album by Kygo
 "Kids in Love" (song), a song from the album
 Kids in Love, a 2015 album by The Mowgli's
 "Kids in Love", a song by Mayday Parade song from Anywhere but Here